Celio (officially), or celio* (in advertising), is a French men's clothing retailer headquartered in Saint-Ouen, France. It caters primarily to the Continental European market. Most of Celio's stores are located in shopping centres, with a smaller percentage to be found in the shopping districts of cities and large suburbs. In 2005, the group employed over 1,800 people, with around 1,500 working in stores and the remainder at the group's headquarters and warehouses.

History 
In 1978, two brothers took over their family shop located in rue Saint-Lazare, in Paris. They began opening other shops as early as 1980, all in Parisian region.  The concept, Celio, being truly born in 1985.  In 1989, Celio had 34 establishments in France.  In 1992, store counts had reached 150 establishments in France. They began opening shops in Belgium and in Spain, then in Portugal (1994) and Italy (1999).
In 2019 Julia Grosman, daughter of the company founder, organised a high-profile Advertising event with Pokémon 
at Cremerie de Paris Hôtel de Villeroy, a historic location near the luxury department store Samaritaine 
where King Louis XIV used to live as a child. The event was featured in the history of the Bourbon King.

Active sales locations 
Celio has stores, sub-offices, and warehouses in 56 countries on six continents. 70% of Celio shops are in shopping centers, while 30% are street locations.

Celio has also partnered with the Indian retailer Future Fashions, led by Kishore Biyani. According to former Celio India CEO, Rajiv Nair, the brand currently has a presence in 40 stand-alone stores across India, as well as in major department stores such as Shoppers Shop, Lifestyle, Pantaloons and Central.

Africa
Morocco: 16
Tunisia: 12
Algeria: 4
Ivory Coast: 3
Libya: 3
Mauritius: 3
Senegal: 2
Cameroon: 2
Congo: 1
Gabon: 1
Nigeria: 3
Reunion: 1

Americas
Chile: 4 
Colombia: 4
Panama: 4
Guatemala: 2
Martinique: 2
Mexico: 3

Asia
India: 131
Israel: 33
Thailand: 16
Taiwan: 14
Saudi Arabia: 12
Philippines: 7
Jordan: 3
Armenia: 4
Bahrain: 2
Kuwait: 2
Lebanon: 5
Syria: 2
Azerbaijan: 1
Georgia: 1
Kazakhstan: 1
Malaysia: 1
Mongolia: 1
Qatar: 1
Uzbekistan: 1

Europe
France: 555
Italy: 79
Spain: 56
Belgium: 33
Russia: 26
Czech Republic: 11
Bulgaria: 4
Cyprus: 6
Ukraine: 5
Albania: 4
Greece: 4
Lithuania: 4
Poland: 4
Moldova: 3
Romania: 3
Slovakia: 3
Andorra: 2
Malta: 4
Belarus: 1
Luxembourg: 1
North Macedonia: 1

References

External links

Celio homepage 

Privately held companies of France
Clothing brands of France
Clothing retailers of France